( ) is a municipality in Trøndelag county, Norway. It is part of the Namdalen region. The administrative centre of the municipality is the town of Namsos. Some of the villages in the municipality include Bangsund, Klinga, Ramsvika, Skomsvoll, Spillum, Sævik, Dun, Salsnes, Nufsfjord, Lund, Namdalseid, Sjøåsen, Statland, Tøttdalen, and Sverkmoen.

The  municipality is the 30th largest by area out of the 356 municipalities in Norway. Namsos is the 80th most populous municipality in Norway with a population of 15,001.

General information

Name
The municipality is named after the town of Namsos which was established in 1846. The town was named after its location at the mouth of a river. The river name has an uncertain origin. The first part of the river name comes from the Old Norse word ) which has an unknown meaning, but it may come from the word  which means "boat". The second part of the river name  which means "sea". In 2019, the municipality was formally given a co-equal name in the Southern Sámi language: .

Coat of arms
The coat of arms was granted to the town of Namsos on 5 May 1961. They were re-granted on 21 October 1966 when the town was merged with neighboring areas to create a new, larger Namsos Municipality. The official blazon is "Gules, a moose head couped Or". This means the arms have a red field (background) and the charge is a moose head. The moose head has a tincture of Or which means it is commonly colored yellow, but if it is made out of metal, then gold is used. The moose was chosen as a symbol for the municipality, since Namsos is the capital of the forest-rich Namdalen region, and the moose is the "king of the forest". The arms were designed by Hallvard Trætteberg. The municipal flag has the same design as the coat of arms.

Churches
The Church of Norway has seven parishes within the municipality of Namsos. It is part of the Namdal prosti (deanery) in the Diocese of Nidaros.

History
The location by the river and the large forests nearby made the town ideal for sawmills. There were eleven mills in their heyday, but only one remains: Moelven Van Severen. In addition, the Norwegian Sawmill Museum is located at Spillum just south of the town. The museum is located at the now closed and restored Spillum Dampsag & Hovleri sawmill from 1884. The town has a swimming pool, Oasen, built inside a mountain.

In 1865, the town of Namsos also became a parish in the Church of Norway. It had been decided to build a church in the city in March 1859; the construction was finished in November. In May 1865, the parish was created, with the sub-parishes of Sævik and Vemundvik, formerly within Overhalla parish, was incorporated into Namsos' parish limits.

Consisting mostly of wooden houses, the town of Namsos has been burned down to the ground on three occasions during its relatively short history. The first fire was in 1872, caused by two boys playing with matches. The second fire was in 1897, from an unknown cause. The third time was during World War II when the town was bombed by German airplanes on 20 April 1940.

Municipal history
On 1 January 1838, the parish of Vemundvik was established as a municipality (see formannskapsdistrikt law). In 1846, the village of Namsos in Vemundvik was established as a ladested. Namsos was located at the mouth of the Namsen river in the Sævik area of Vemundvik. The new ladested (town) was established as its own municipality, with 591 inhabitants. This left Vemundvik with 908 residents.

Areas of Vemundvik lying adjacent to the town of Namsos were later incorporated within the city limits on numerous occasions. On 1 January 1882, an area with 109 inhabitants was moved to the town; on 1 July 1921 an area with 927 inhabitants; and on 1 July 1957, another area with a population of 6.

During the 1960s, there were many municipal mergers across Norway due to the work of the Schei Committee. On 1 January 1964, the size of Namsos was significantly increased as the neighboring municipalities of Vemundvik (population: 2,040) and Klinga (population: 2,482) were incorporated into the town of Namsos (population: 5,224). On the same date, the northern part of the neighboring municipality of Otterøy (population: 1,013), and the Finnanger area of Fosnes municipality (population: 116) were also incorporated into Namsos. Namsos, which previously had a population of 5,224, had its size increased to 10,875 inhabitants.

On 1 January 2018, the municipality switched from the old Nord-Trøndelag county to the new Trøndelag county.

On 1 January 2020, the three neighboring municipalities of Fosnes, Namsos, and Namdalseid merged to form a new, larger Namsos municipality. This occurred because on 16 June 2016 the three municipalities voted to merge as part of a large municipal reform across Norway.

Geography
The municipality also includes the islands of Otterøya and Hoddøya as well as the southwestern half of Elvalandet island.

The main part of the town is built on a small, low-lying promontory which extends into the bay. To the east extends the wide Namdalen valley. To the south over the bay and mouth of the river Namsen are hills that reach .

Climate
Namsos has a humid continental climate or oceanic climate, depending on the winter threshold used (0C or -3C). The all-time high is  recorded on July 27, 2019. The warmest month on record at the airport was July 2014 with average daily high  and monthly mean . Namsos Airport recorded  on May 31, 2013, which is the record high for May for the Trøndelag region. The record low  was recorded January 2010. Autumn and winter are the wettest seasons, while late spring is the driest.

Government
All municipalities in Norway, including Namsos, are responsible for primary education (through tenth grade), outpatient health services, senior citizen services, unemployment and other social services, zoning, economic development, and municipal roads. The municipality is governed by a municipal council of elected representatives, which in turn elect a mayor.  The municipality falls under the Trøndelag District Court and the Frostating Court of Appeal.

Municipal council
The municipal council of Namsos is made up of 41 representatives that are elected to four year terms. The party breakdown of the council is as follows:

Mayors
The mayors of Namsos:

1855–1857: Theodor Wessel 
1858-1858: Christian Møinichen Havig 
1859-1859: Theodor Wessel 
1860-1860: Carl Julius Olsen 
1861–1863: Theodor Wessel 
1864-1864: Carl Julius Olsen 
1865–1867: Johan Sommerschield 
1868-1868: Niels Bjørum 
1869-1869: H.J. Blix 
1870-1870: J. Salvesen 
1871–1875: Johan Sommerschield 
1876–1878: Andreas Erlandsen
1879–1886: Johannes Bernhard Havig (H)
1887–1894: Karl Greiff (H)
1895–1899: Carl Hustad (V)
1900–1905: Karl Greiff (H)
1906–1907: Ole Severin Aavatsmark (V)
1908–1909: Otto Christian Dahl (AvH)
1910–1913: Ole Severin Aavatsmark (V)
1914–1919: Anton M. Brandtzæg (H)
1920–1922: Einar Hustad (V)
1923–1924: Hermann Thornes (Ap)
1924–1926: Wilhelm Jakobsen (Ap)
1927-1927: Johan Wiik (Ap)
1928-1928: Reidar O. Frog (Ap)
1929–1930: Einar Hustad (V)
1930–1934: Johannes Dahl (AvH)
1935–1941: Hermann Thornes (Ap/NS)
1941–1945: Arne Dahl (NS)
1945-1945: Johan L. Gundersen (Ap)
1946–1947: Nils Bleness (Ap)
1947-1947: Adolf Holm (Ap)
1948–1951: Eystein Sjaamo (Ap)
1952–1955: Olferd Hojem (Ap)
1956–1963: Erling Thun (Ap)
1964–1975: Svein Lorentzen (Ap)
1976-1991: Gunnar Solum (Ap)
1992-2003: Snorre Ness (Ap)
2003-2007: Kåre Aalberg (SV)
2007-2015: Morten Stene (Ap)
2015–2021: Arnhild Holstad (Ap)
2021–present: Frode Båtnes (Ap)

Transportation
Namsos Airport is located just outside the town of Namsos, around 3 km from the city, with direct flights to Oslo, Trondheim, Rørvik, Mosjøen, Bodø. 
Norwegian County Road 17 runs through part of the municipality.

The closed Namsos Line runs from Namsos to Grong. The island of Otterøya is connected to the mainland via the Lokkaren Bridge.

Notable people

Public service 
 Jørgen Johannes Havig (1808–1883) bailiff (lensmann), farmer and politician; helped found  Namsos
 Christian Møinichen Havig (1825 in Overhalla – 1912) a Norwegian bailiff, (lensmann) 
 Fredrik Havig (1855 in Namdalen – 1927) a Norwegian judge, Mayor and politician
 Osborne J. P. Widtsoe (1877 in Namsos – 1920) principal of the Latter-day Saints University in Salt Lake City
 Olav Heggstad (1877 in Namsos – 1954) a civil engineer and professor at the Norwegian Institute of Technology
 Otto Christian Dahl (1903 in Namsos – 1995) a missionary in Madagascar, linguist and government scholar
 Knut Løfsnes (1918 in Namsos – 1996) a Norwegian resistance member, politician and lawyer
 Live Marié Strømmen (2001 Namsos - present day) a breakdancer and saleswoman
 Guttorm Hansen (1920 in Namsos – 2009) a writer and politician; President of the Storting 1973-1981 and a prolific book writer
 Gunnar Solum (1929–2008) a Norwegian politician, four time Mayor of Namsos
 Anne Alvik (born 1937) a Norwegian physician and civil servant.
 Harald Tveit Alvestrand (born 1959 Namsos) a Norwegian computer scientist

The Arts 

 Olav Duun (1876 on Jøa – 1939) a noteworthy author of Norwegian fiction
 Arne Svendsen (1884 in Fosnes – 1958) a songwriter, folk poet, actor and revue writer 
 Simon Flem Devold (1929 in Namsos – 2015) an author, journalist and jazz clarinetist
 Åge Aleksandersen (born 1949 in Namsos) a Norwegian singer, songwriter and guitarist
 Terje Tysland (born 1951 in Namsos) a singer, songwriter, guitarist and accordion player
 Idar Lind (born 1954 on Otterøya) novelist, crime fiction writer, songwriter and playwright
 Carl Frode Tiller (born 1970 in Namsos) a Nynorsk author, historian and musician
 Frode Saugestad (born 1974 in Namsos) a literary scholar, publisher and adventurer
 Jostein Gulbrandsen (born 1976 in Namsos) a New York-based guitarist and composer
 Jon Rune Strøm (born 1985 in Namsos) a Jazz musician, plays Upright bass & Bass guitar
 D.D.E. a pop/rock group founded in Namsos in 1992

Sport 

 Anton Dahl (1882 in Bangsund –  1952) a sports shooter, competed at the 1920 Summer Olympics
 Tone Haugen (born 1964 in Namsos) a former footballer with 90 appearances with the Norway women's national football team and team bronze medallist at the 1996 Summer Olympics
 Per Joar Hansen (born 1965 in Namsos) a Norwegian football coach
 twins Nina Solheim & Mona Solheim (born 1979) Norwegian taekwondo practitioners
 Gunhild Følstad (born 1981 in Overhalla) a former footballer, made 76 appearances for the Norway women's national football team
 Kjell Rune Sellin (born 1989 in Namsos) a footballer with over 300 club caps

Media gallery

References

External links

Municipal fact sheet from Statistics Norway 
Oasen Swimming Pool 
Avinor: Picture showing Namsos Airport and Namsos

 
Municipalities of Trøndelag
1846 establishments in Norway